Winning Group Arena, is an indoor arena in Brno, Czech Republic. The capacity of the arena is 7,700 people and it was built in 1982. It is currently home to the HC Kometa Brno ice hockey team.

Until 2011, the arena was named Hala Rondo. However, after Kajotbet started sponsoring the arena, it was renamed Kajot Arena. After the end of the contract, it was called "Rondo Hall" again until a new sponsorship with DRFG was signed in 2015, renaming the arena to DRFG Arena.

References

External links 
 

Indoor ice hockey venues in the Czech Republic
Buildings and structures in Brno
Sport in Brno
Sports venues completed in 1982
1982 establishments in Czechoslovakia
20th-century architecture in the Czech Republic